The former First Church of Christ, Scientist, built in 1897, is a historic Neo-Classical-style church located at 4017 S. Drexel Boulevard in Chicago, Illinois. It was designed by noted Chicago-based  architect Solon Spencer Beman, who was renowned for the churches and other buildings that he  designed in the United States. In 1923 an Aeolian-Skinner organ was installed in the church. On  May 7, 1950,  Grant Memorial AME Church bought the building and is its present owner. First Church of Christ, Scientist, Chicago, is no longer in existence.

See also

 First Church of Christ, Scientist (disambiguation)
 List of former Christian Science churches, societies and buildings

References

Resources
 Faulkner, Charles Draper, Christian Science Church Edifices second edition, 1946, Chicago: self-published, has a photo on p. 60.

External links
 Grant Memorial Church website
 Open House Chicago page for the church
Chicago Landmarks: Solon S. Beman
 Grant Memorial AME Church history
Aeolian Skinner archives

Churches completed in 1897
19th-century Christian Science church buildings
Churches in Chicago
Former Christian Science churches, societies and buildings in Illinois
Solon Spencer Beman church buildings